The FIFA Women's World Cup is an international association football competition established in 1991. It is contested by the women's national teams of the members of Fédération Internationale de Football Association (FIFA), the sport's global governing body. The tournament has taken place every four years.

The World Cup opening match is the first of the competition. Opening match regulations have changed many times. Four times the opening matches involved the host nations and one time involved the defending champion.

List of opening matches

See also 
List of FIFA Women's World Cup finals

FIFA Women's World Cup openings
Lists of FIFA Women's World Cup matches
FIFA Women's World Cup-related lists